Tales of Unease was a British supernatural drama series based on a series of horror story anthologies, edited by John Burke.

The series ran for seven episodes in 1970. The anthologies were published between 1960 and 1969.

Episode list
Ride, Ride (written by Michael Hastings)
Calculated Nightmare (written by John Burke)
The Black Goddess (written by Jack Griffith)
It's Too Late Now (written by Andrea Newman)
Superstitious Ignorance (written by Michael Cornish)
Bad Bad Jo Jo (written by James Leo Herlihy)
The Old Banger (written by Richardson Morgan)

External links
Tales of Unease.

British supernatural television shows
1970s British drama television series
English-language television shows
1970 British television series debuts
1970 British television series endings
1970s British anthology television series
London Weekend Television shows